Dickey–Stephens Park is a baseball park in North Little Rock, Arkansas, United States. The ballpark is primarily used for baseball and serves as the home for the Arkansas Travelers of the Texas League. The capacity of the ballpark is 7,300 which includes 5,800 fixed seats capacity and 1,500 on the berms. It opened in 2007 as a replacement for Ray Winder Field in Little Rock, Arkansas. The ballpark is named after four local Arkansas brothers: Baseball Hall of Famer Bill Dickey, former Major League Baseball catcher George Dickey, and businessmen Jackson T. Stephens and W. R. Stephens.

History
The majority of the ballpark's cost—about 83%—was paid for by the public. On August 9, 2005, 54.3% of voters of North Little Rock approved a temporary 1% sales tax increase that funded $28 million of the cost from the two years the tax was collected. Another $5.6 million was to be raised from ballpark revenue. On the private side of the ledger, Warren Stephens made a financial contribution of $440,494 and a land donation valued at $6.3 million. Also, the North Little Rock City Beautiful Commission donated $15,000.

The ballpark was designed by HKS, Inc. of Dallas, Texas while the general contractor was a joint venture of Hensel Phelps Construction of Austin, Texas and East-Harding Construction of Little Rock, Arkansas. A groundbreaking ceremony was held on November 30, 2005 with the actual construction beginning on January 26, 2006. The construction was completed on March 27, 2007, spanning over a period of 426 days.

The ballpark opened on April 12, 2007, where the Frisco RoughRiders beat the Travelers 6–5 with 7,943 fans in attendance. The ballpark was also the location where Tulsa Drillers batting coach Mike Coolbaugh was killed during a game against the Travelers. During the July 22, 2007 game, Coolbaugh was struck in the neck by a hard struck line drive as he was standing in the first base coaches box, and died an hour later from the impact of the injury that resulted in a severe brain hemorrhage. The result of Coolbaugh's death led to the decision by Major League Baseball (MLB) general managers to require base coaches to wear helmets on the field during games, starting with the 2008 MLB season.

Gallery

References

External links
Official website

2007 establishments in Arkansas
Baseball venues in Arkansas
Sports in Little Rock, Arkansas
Buildings and structures in North Little Rock, Arkansas
Tourist attractions in North Little Rock, Arkansas
Sports venues completed in 2007
Texas League ballparks